Charles Cornwallis, 2nd Baron Cornwallis of Eye (1632 – 13 April 1673) was an English landowner and politician who sat in the House of Commons from 1660 to 1662 when he inherited the peerage as Baron Cornwallis.

Early years
Cornwallis was born in Culford, Suffolk, the son of Sir Frederick Cornwallis, 1st Baron Cornwallis and his wife Elizabeth Ashburnham, daughter of Sir John Ashburnham and Elizabeth Richardson, 1st Lady Cramond, and was baptised on 19 April 1632. His uncle was John Ashburnham. His paternal grandparents were Sir William Cornwallis and Jane Meautys (died 1 July 1627). Cornwallis's parents lived much of the time in London, his father being a Royalist and an Equerry to Charles I, while his mother was a Lady-in-Waiting to the Queen.

With his parents busy at Court, Cornwallis and his three siblings were raised at Culford Hall by their grandmother, Lady Jane, who was by then married to her second husband, Sir Nathaniel Bacon. Their home, Culford Hall, had been built by Lady Jane's father-in-law, Sir Nicholas Bacon, 1st Baronet. It is through Lady Jane that Culford Hall eventually passed from Bacon to Frederick, becoming home to the Earls of Cornwallis.

Career
In April 1660, Cornwallis was elected Member of Parliament for Eye in the Convention Parliament. He was created Knight of the Bath on  23 April 1661. In 1661 he was re-elected MP for Eye in the Cavalier Parliament and sat until 1662 when on the death of his father he inherited the peerage. He became J.P. in 1662 and as county magistrate, he was one of the appointees at the assize who oversaw a test of accused women in the Lowestoft Witch Trial.

Cornwallis died aged 41, and was buried at Culford.

Family
At age 19, Cornwallis married Margaret Playsted (died 1668), daughter of Sir Thomas Playsted of Arlington, East Sussex. They had eleven children but, as their eldest two sons died young, their son Charles succeeded to the title. He is buried under a monument in St. Mary's Church, Culford. St. Mary's Church was built by their daughter-in-law Elizabeth's father, Sir Stephen Fox.

References

External links
Home of the Cornwallis family, Eye, Suffolk

1632 births
1673 deaths
17th-century English nobility
Members of the Privy Council of England
People from the Borough of St Edmundsbury
Politics of Suffolk
Charles
English MPs 1660
English MPs 1661–1679
Burials in Suffolk
Barons Cornwallis